The 2009 Indian general election in Bihar were held for 40 seats with the state going to polls in the first four phases of the general elections. The major contenders in the state were the National Democratic Alliance (NDA),
Indian National Congress and the Fourth Front.  NDA consisted of the Bharatiya Janata Party (BJP) and Janata Dal (United) whereas the fourth front was constituted of the Rashtriya Janata Dal (RJD), Lok Janshakti Party (LJP) and the Samajwadi Party (SP).

The results indicated the complete reversal of the last election, where the NDA won this state in a landslide securing 32 out of 40 seats.  The victory is mostly credited to the work of Nitish Kumar and JD(U), and this is the only state where the NDA has had the most success since, they were defeated by Congress and allies, in all the other states, leading to their heavy losses for the NDA in the election.

After disagreement with the UPA on seat sharing, Lalu Prasad Yadav of the Rashtriya Janata Dal joined hands with Lok Janshakti Party and Ram Vilas Paswan, and joined the Fourth Front, with Samajwadi Party. This move proved to be disastrous, since LJP couldn't win a single seat, and RJD were reduced to 4 seats in the Lok Sabha. After the election Laloo Prasad Yadav, admitted that it was a mistake to leave the UPA, and gave unconditional support to Manmohan Singh and the newly formed UPA government.

Voting and results
Source: Election Commission of India

Results by Alliance

List of Elected MPs

Bye-elections

References

Indian general elections in Bihar
2000s in Bihar
Bihar